The Eastern Yacht Club is located in Marblehead, Massachusetts and  founded in 1870. It is one of the oldest yacht clubs on the east coast with significant involvement in the history of American yachting.

History 

The current clubhouse was constructed in 1880. The first meeting of the club was at Mr. John Heard's house in Boston on March 5, 1870. A club house location committee was led by B.W. Crowninshield, and a site on Marblehead neck was purchased. A new structure was built and officially opened on June 9, 1881.

The Eastern Club House 1881

Design and construction 
Construction began in 1880, and was designed in the popular stick style. Inside features a model room, with full and half hull models of member yachts through the years.Later additions are wing and a tower, staff and guest overnight rooms, a main dining room and bar. and would expand the complex to include tennis courts and a swimming pool. The club suffered a few fires over years losing the right tower tower portion.

Notable races 
 One Design Racing
 Marblehead Race Week
 Team Racing
 Pursuit Racing

Notable Affiliated yachts

World War I contributions 
When the United States entered the war, Commodore Herbert Sears called the Under Secretary of the Navy, Franklin Roosevelt, and offered the use of the Eastern clubhouse to the Navy as a base. Roosevelt accepted and the clubhouse was used as a training station for the final year of World War I, primarily for training ashore and aviation training.

A group of 14 members wanting to contribute to the war effort,  ordered and personally financed boats to be used by the Navy as patrol craft and built with Navy approval of the design. Known as "The Eastern Yacht Club 62 footers", the boats were designed by Albert Loring Swasey and Nathanael Greene Herreshoff. The boats bore names under construction chosen by the owners and were then given their Section Patrol numbers once accepted by the Navy. The Eastern Yacht Club boats with sponsors were:

USS Apache (SP-729) — Robert F. Herrick
USS Ellen (SP-1209) — Charles P. Curtis
USS Inca (SP-1212) — Frank B. McQuesten
USS Kangaroo (SP-1284) — Henry A. Morss, Charles A. Morss, Everett Morss
USS Daiquiri (SP-1285) — Charles F. Ayer, Osborne Howes, Frank S. Eaton, Oliver Ames
USS Snark (SP-1291) — Carl H. Tucker
USS Commodore (SP-1425) — Flag officers of the Eastern Yacht Club, Herbert M. Sears, Max Agassiz, J. S. Lawrence
USS Sea Hawk (SP-2365) — Arthur Winslow, Edwin S. Webster, Charles A. Stone

Plus one built to the design independently:
USS War Bug (SP-1795) — Felix Warburg

References

External links 

Yacht clubs in the United States
Buildings and structures in Marblehead, Massachusetts
1880 establishments in Massachusetts
Yachting associations in the United States